The 2015–16 UMBC Retrievers women's basketball team will represent the University of Maryland, Baltimore County in the America East Conference. The Retrievers were led by fourteenth year head coach Phil Stern and will once again play their home games in the Retriever Activities Center. They finished the season 18–14, 8–8 in America East play to finish in a 3-way tie for fourth place. They lost in the quarterfinals of the America East women's tournament to Maine. They were invited to the Women's Basketball Invitational where they defeated Fairfield in the first round before losing to Youngstown State in the quarterfinals.

Media
All non-televised home games and conference road games will stream on either ESPN3 or AmericaEast.tv. Most road games will stream on the opponents website. Select games will be broadcast on the radio on WQLL-1370 AM.

Roster

Schedule

|-
!colspan=12 style="background:#000000; color:#ffb210;"| Non-conference regular season

|-
!colspan=12 style="background:#000000; color:#ffb210;"| America East regular season

|-
!colspan=12 style="background:#000000; color:#ffb210;"| America East Women's Tournament

|-
!colspan=12 style="background:#000000; color:#ffb210;"| WBI

See also
2016–17 UMBC Retrievers women's basketball team
2015–16 UMBC Retrievers men's basketball team

References

UMBC
UMBC Retrievers women's basketball seasons
UMBC
UMBC
UMBC